1984 is the second studio album by Roger Miret and the Disasters. It was released on February 22, 2005.

Track listing

Credits
 Roger Miret – vocals, guitar
 Rhys Kill – guitar, backup vocals
 Brian Darwas – bass, backup vocals
 Mike Mulieri – drums, backup vocals
 Al Barr – guest vocals on "The Boys"
 Matt Ciotti – backup vocals
 Dave Alvarado – backup vocals
 John Jensen – backup vocals
 Luke245 – backup vocals
 Franco Bronx – backup vocals
 Zeuss – engineering, mixing
 Alan Douches – mastering

References

Roger Miret and The Disasters albums
2005 albums
Hellcat Records albums